War brides are women who married military personnel from other countries in times of war or during military occupations, a practice that occurred in great frequency during World War I and World War II.

Among the largest and best documented examples of this were the marriages between American servicemen and German women which took place after World War II. By 1949, over 20,000 German war brides had emigrated to the United States. Furthermore, it was estimated that there are 15,000 Australian women who married American servicemen based in Australia during World War II and moved to the U.S. to be with their husbands. Allied servicemen also married many women in other countries where they were stationed at the end of the war, including France, Italy, Luxembourg, the Philippines, Japan and China. This also occurred in Korea and Vietnam with the later wars in those countries involving U.S. troops and other anti-communist soldiers. As many as 100,000 G.I. war brides left the United Kingdom, 150,000 to 200,000 hailed from continental Europe, 15,500 from Australia and 1,500 from New Zealand, between the years 1942 and 1952.

The reasons for women marrying foreign soldiers and leaving their homelands vary. Particularly after World War II, many women in war-torn Europe and Asia saw marriage as a means of escaping their devastated countries.

Philippine–American War
Due to the Philippine–American War, a few U.S. servicemen would take Filipinas as their wives, with documentation as early as 1902 of one immigrating with their servicemember husband to the U.S. Those Filipinas were already U.S. nationals and so when they immigrated to the U.S., their legal status was made significantly different from that of previous Asian immigrants to the U.S.

War brides in World War II

United States
During and immediately after World War II, more than 60,000 U.S. servicemen married women overseas and they were promised that their wives and children would receive free passage to the U.S. The U.S. Army's "Operation War Bride", which eventually transported an estimated 70,000 women and children, began in Britain in early 1946. The press dubbed it "Operation Diaper Run". The first group of war brides (452 British women and their 173 children, and one bridegroom) left Southampton harbor on SS Argentina on January 26, 1946, and arrived in the U.S. on February 4, 1946. According to British Post-War Migration, the Immigration and Naturalization Service reported 37,553 war brides from the "British Isles" took advantage of the War Brides Act of 1945 to emigrate to the United States, along with 59 "war bridegrooms". Over the years, an estimated 300,000 foreign war brides moved to the United States following the passage of the War Brides Act and its subsequent amendments, of which 51,747 were Filipinos. According to journalist Craft Young, a daughter of a Japanese war bride, there are an estimated 50,000 Japanese war brides.

Robyn Arrowsmith, a historian who spent nine years researching Australia's war brides, said that between 12,000 and 15,000 Australian women had married visiting U.S. servicemen and moved to the U.S. with their husbands. Significantly, an estimated 30,000 to 40,000 Newfoundland women married American servicemen during the time of Ernest Harmon Air Force Base's existence (1941–1966), in which tens of thousands of U.S. servicemen arrived to defend the island and North America from Nazi Germany during World War II and the Soviet Union during the Cold War. So many of those war brides settled in the U.S. that in 1966, the Newfoundland government created a tourism campaign specifically tailored to provide opportunities for them and their families to reunite.

United Kingdom
Some war brides came from Australia to Britain aboard HMS Victorious following World War II. Roughly 70,000 war brides left Britain for America during the 1940s.

Australia

In 1945 and 1946 several bride trains were run in Australia to transport war brides and their children traveling to or from ships.

In 1948, Immigration Minister Arthur Calwell announced that no Japanese war brides would be allowed to settle in Australia, stating "it would be the grossest act of public indecency to permit any Japanese of either sex to pollute Australia" while relatives of deceased Australian soldiers were alive.

About 650 Japanese war brides migrated to Australia after the ban was lifted in 1952 when the San Francisco Peace Treaty came into force. They had married Australian soldiers involved in the occupation of Japan.

Canada
47,783 British war brides arrived in Canada accompanied by some 21,950 children. Since 1939, most Canadian soldiers were stationed in Britain. As such, about 90% of all war brides arriving in Canada were British. 3,000 war brides came from the Netherlands, Belgium, Newfoundland, France, Italy, Ireland, and Scotland. The first marriage between a Canadian serviceman and a British bride was registered at Farnborough Church in the Aldershot area in December 1939, just 43 days after the first Canadian soldiers arrived. Many of those war brides emigrated to Canada beginning in 1944 and peaking in 1946. A special Canadian agency, the Canadian Wives' Bureau was set up by the Canadian Department of Defence to arrange transport and assist war brides in the transition to Canadian life. The majority of Canadian war brides landed at Pier 21 in Halifax, Nova Scotia, most commonly on the following troop and hospital ships: Queen Mary, Lady Nelson, Letitia,  Mauretania, RMS Scythia and Île de France.

The Canadian Museum of Immigration at Pier 21 has exhibits and collections dedicated to war brides. There is a National Historic Site marker located at Pier 21, as well.

Italy
During the campaign of 1943–1945, there were more than 10,000 marriages between Italian women and American soldiers.

From relationships between Italian women and African American soldiers, "mulattini" were born; many of those children were abandoned in orphanages, because interracial marriage was then not legal in many US states.

Japan
Several thousand Japanese who were sent as colonizers to Manchukuo and Inner Mongolia were left behind in China. Most of the Japanese left behind in China were women, most of whom married Chinese men and became known as "stranded war wives" (zanryu fujin). Because they had children fathered by Chinese men, the Japanese women were not allowed to bring their Chinese families back with them to Japan and so most of them stayed. Japanese law allowed only children fathered by Japanese fathers to become Japanese citizens. It was not until 1972 that Sino-Japanese diplomacy was restored, which allowed those survivors the opportunity to visit or emigrate to Japan. Even then, they faced difficulties; many had been missing so long that they had been declared dead at home.

Vietnam
Some Japanese soldiers married Vietnamese women like Nguyen Thi Xuan and Nguyen Thi Thu and fathered multiple children with the Vietnamese women who remained behind in Vietnam, and the Japanese soldiers themselves returned to Japan in 1955. The official Vietnamese historical narrative view them as children of rape and prostitution. The Japanese forced Vietnamese women to become comfort women and with Burmese, Indonesia, Thai and Filipino women they made up a notable portion of Asian comfort women in general. Japanese use of Malaysian and Vietnamese women as comfort women was corroborated by testimonies. There were comfort women stations in Malaysia, Indonesia, Philippines, Burma, Thailand, Cambodia, Vietnam, North Korea, and South Korea. A Korean comfort woman named Kim Ch'un-hui stayed behind in Vietnam and died there when she was 44 in 1963, owning a dairy farm, cafe, U.S. cash, and diamonds worth 200,000 U.S. dollars.

A number of Japanese soldiers stayed behind immediately after the war to stay with their war brides, but in 1954 they were ordered to return to Japan by the Vietnamese government and were "encouraged" to abandon their wives and children.

The now abandoned Vietnamese war brides who had mothered children would be forced to raise them by themselves and often faced harsh criticism for having relations with members of an enemy army that had occupied Vietnam.

Korean War
6,423 Korean women married U.S. military personnel as war brides during and immediately after the Korean War.

Vietnam War
8,040 Vietnamese women came to the U.S. as war brides between 1964 and 1975.

Iraq War
War brides from wars subsequent to Vietnam became less common due to differences in religion and culture, shorter durations of wars, and direct orders. As of 2006, about 1,500 visa requests had been made by US military personnel for Iraqi spouses and fiancées. There have been several well-publicized cases of American soldiers marrying Iraqi women.

Notes

References

See also

 War Brides Act
 Eswyn Lyster (1923–2009), a British-born Canadian author best known for writing extensively on the Canadian war bride experience
 War children
 Brides of ISIL
 GI Brides, a narrative non-fiction book about British war brides of World War II
 War Brides, a 1916 silent film by Herbert Brenon and starring Alla Nazimova
 I Was a Male War Bride, a screwball comedy film featuring Cary Grant as a male war bride
 Roger Charlier (1921–2018), inspiration for the film
 Japanese War Bride, a 1952 film by King Vidor featuring Shirley Yamaguchi and Don Taylor
 Madame Butterfly, a 1904 opera by Giacomo Puccini about a Japanese child bride who is abandoned by her husband, a US Navy lieutenant, redone in 1989 as Miss Saigon

External links
 "American War Bride Experience; Fact, Stories about American War Brides"; American War World II GI Brides. website
 Luxembourg War Brides; "The Meeting of Anni Adams:  The Butterfly of Luxembourg"; American War Brides. website
 Australian War Brides website
 Canadian War Brides of WW II website
 Newfoundland & Labrador War Brides website
 Canadian War Brides from Veterans' Affairs Canada website
 CBC Digital Archives – Love and War: Canadian War Brides
 Yankee boys, Kiwi girls history webpage
 Marriages from Problems of the 2NZEF (eText of Official History of New Zealand in WW II)
 New Zealand servicemen and their war brides, 1946 (photo)
 Eswyn Lyster's Canadian War Bride page – the book "Most Excellent Citizens"
 War brides of World War II reunion 2007
 Canadian War Brides of the First World War website

Bride
Bride
Wives
Bride
Bride